Philaronia abjecta is a species of spittlebug in the family Aphrophoridae. It is found in Central America and North America.

References

Articles created by Qbugbot
Insects described in 1876
Aphrophoridae